Atlantic Studios is the recording studio network of Atlantic Records. Although the historic recording studio was located at 1841 Broadway (at the corner of 60th Street), in New York City, Atlantic Recording Studios was initially located at 234 West 56th Street from November 1947 until mid-1956. When the Shorty Rogers and His Giants disc of 33.33 rpm called Martians Come Back! was issued in August 1956, the address of Atlantic Recording Studios had relocated to 157 W 57th Street. The studio was the first to record in stereo due to the efforts of Tom Dowd. The new Atlantic Studios includes a network of label-operated studios spanning New York, Atlanta, and California.

The Studios
In the early days of Atlantic Records, producer Tom Dowd would do recording at the offices. At night the desks would be pushed against the walls and singing groups would gather around one or two microphones in the inner office and he would be in the outer office recording singing groups with a small mixer and a tape recorder.

In 1958, Dowd convinced Ampex (and Jerry Wexler) to sell the second Ampex 8-track tape recorder ever manufactured to Atlantic Studios, putting Atlantic ahead of other studios for many years.

In 1959, Atlantic Records and Atlantic Studios moved to 1841 Broadway. The studios were in the co-joined building at 11 West 60th Street. When Atlantic Records moved to 75 Rockefeller Center in the mid-1970s, Atlantic Studios expanded to occupy the entire second floor of both buildings. In the early 1980s, the studios expanded to the third floor.

The studio complex eventually consisted of two studios, a mix room, two disk mastering rooms, two editing and tape copy rooms, two digital transfer rooms, a quality control room for Atlantic Records-manufactured products (45s, LPs, Cassettes, 8-Tracks and CDs), tape library (tape vault offsite) and several offices and lounges.

Studio A - approximately 50' x 30' x 15', control room 20' x 15', and a later a Hidley redesign 24' x 24'. The control room had two generations of MCI consoles (the "black" console and then a 528), later the Hidley control room had a custom Neve. Monitors were by Altec, UREI and Hidley. Tommy Dowd early on installed variable acoustic sound traps that affected both the low frequency absorption and the reverberation time in the studio.

Studio B - approximately 30' x 15' x  15', control room 15' x 15'. Consoles were MCI 528 and then Neve, and monitoring was by Altec and then UREI.

Mix Room - approximately  15' x 12', later a new repositioned mix room and vocal booth 20 x 18'. Consoles were a built-in-house 16-channel passive summing mixer, then original Studio A MCI  "black" console, then a third MCI 528 purchased from Criteria Studios, with a Solid State Logic console in the new mix room. Monitoring was facilitated with Altec monitors.

Mastering Rooms - Neumann and Scully Disk Cutting systems, and Altec monitoring.

Tape Recorders - Ampex, Scully, MCI, Studer, and Sony.

Microphones - Neumann, AKG, Sennheiser, Electro-Voice, Sony, Shure, and RCA.

Outboard Equipment - Dolby, Teletronix, Pultec, Lang, Spectra-Sonic, Eventide, Allison Research, Audio & Design, Ltd and Fairchild.

Reverberation - An echo chamber was built in the basement of 1841 Broadway, but it was rarely used in later years; reverberation was primarily provided by EMT analog and digital reverberation units.

The studios closed in 1990 and Atlantic Records' in-house digital and analog production rooms and the tape library were re-located to West 54th Street.

Atlantic Records relocated to 1633 Broadway New York, NY in 2015, and opened a new in-house studio, Atlantic Studios NYC, which has hosted numerous artists and sessions, including the Grammy Award-winning Hamilton and Dear Evan Hansen Original Broadway Cast Recordings, Sturgill Simpson, Kaleo, Ed Sheeran, Wiz Khalifa, Cardi B, Brent Cobb, Janelle Monáe, Jason Mraz, Lin-Manuel Miranda, Lauryn Hill, Christina Perri, Charlie Puth, Sara Bareilles, Anne Marie, Shooter Jennings, Rob Thomas, Kelly Clarkson, SWMRS, Christine & The Queens, Melanie Martinez, MisterWives, Wallows, Royal Blood, Santigold, Halestorm, Anderson East, Jon Batiste, ARIZONA, The Roots, Roberta Flack, and many more. 

Atlantic Records studio network also includes Atlantic Studios West in Hollywood, CA; Atlantic Studios NOHO in North Hollywood, CA; Atlantic Studios ATL in Atlanta, Georgia; and a studio in Burbank, CA.

Founders of Atlantic Records
Ahmet Ertegün
Nesuhi Ertegün
Herb Abramson  (co-developer of the studios.)

Producers 

Arif Mardin
Jerry Wexler
İlhan Mimaroğlu
Joel Dorn

Producers - Recording/Mixing Engineers

Tom Dowd (co-developer of the studios)
Jimmy Douglass
Gene Paul (son of Les Paul)
Lew Hahn
Bobby Warner
Adrian Barber
Phil Iehle
Bruce Tergesen

Recording/Mixing Engineers

Tom Heid 
Randy Mason
Bruce Tergesen 
Michael O'Reilly
Bill Dooley
Dan Nash
Stephen Benben

Brian Eddolls - Synclavier Programmer

Mastering Engineers 

George Piros
Dennis King
Rob Grennell
George Peckham

Technical Engineers

Clair Krepps  - Chief Engineer; established his own studio, Mayfair Recording Studios, in 1965. 
Joel Kerr 
Tom Cahill
Sami Ucikan
Ray DeLeon

Management 

Paul Sloman
Dave Teig
Frank Tabino

Selected discography

Tracks
Chronological list, with album, artist, and recording dates : 
"Splish Splash" - Bobby Darin (10 April 1958)
"Mr. Soul" - Buffalo Springfield Again, Buffalo Springfield (9 January 1967)
"Pretty Girl Why" - Last Time Around, Buffalo Springfield (26 February 1967, never released)
"Kind Woman" - Last Time Around, Buffalo Springfield (February–March 1968)
"Bring It On Home" - Led Zeppelin II, Led Zeppelin (1969)
"Don't Knock My Love" - Wilson Pickett (1970)
"Neighbours" - Tattoo You, Rolling Stones (date unknown) also recorded at Pathé Marconi Studios, Paris

Albums
Chronological list with artist, and recording dates :

Pithecanthropus Erectus - Charlie Mingus (30 January 1956)
The Clown (February and March 1957)
Blues & Roots - Charlie Mingus (4 February 1959)
Giant Steps - John Coltrane (1 April, 4 May and 2 December 1959)
Coltrane's Sound - John Coltrane (24 and 26 October 1960)
Dream Weaver - Charles Lloyd (29 and 30 March, 18 September, 29 October 1966)
Lady Soul - Aretha Franklin (1967)
Life Between the Exit Signs - Keith Jarrett (4 May 1967)
Disraeli Gears - Cream (11–15 May 1967)
Wheels of Fire - Cream (between July 1967 and April 1968)
Restoration Ruin - Keith Jarrett (12 May 1968)
Motor-Cycle - Lotti Golden (March 1969)
The Allman Brothers Band
Loaded - The Velvet Underground (between April and August 1970)
Standing Here Wondering Which Way to Go - Marion Williams (25 February 1971)
Words - Donal Leace (13 April 1971)
Donal Leace - Donal Leace (13 April 1971)
El Juicio (The Judgement) - Keith Jarrett (8, 9, 15 and 16 July 1971)
The Mourning of a Star - Keith Jarrett (8, 9 and 16 July 1971)
Birth - Keith Jarrett (15 and 16 July 1971)
The Divine Miss M - Bette Midler (15 and 16 July 1971)
Shotgun Willie - Willie Nelson (date unknown) also recorded at Quadrafonic Studios, Nashville and Sam Phillips Studios, Memphis
Changes One - Charlie Mingus (27, 28 and 30 December 1974)
Main Course - Bee Gees (between January and February 1975) also recorded at Criteria Studios, Miami FL
Live From The Atlantic Studios, Bonfire - AC/DC (7 December 1977)
Fear of Music - Talking Heads (date unknown) also recorded at Hit Factory, RPM Sound, The Record Plant, New York
Chaka - Chaka Khan (1978)
Spy - Carly Simon (from December 1978 to April 1979)
The Honeydrippers: Volume One - Robert Plant (March 1984)
Love Is for Suckers - Twisted Sister (date unknown)
Danzig - Danzig (1987–1988) also recorded at Chung King Metal Studios, New-York
Winger - Winger (1988)

Artists
Alphabetical list of main artists : 

AC/DC
The Allman Brothers
Average White Band
Ray Barretto
The Bee Gees
Laurie Beechman
Laura Branigan
Ruth Brown
Dave Brigati
Eddie Brigati
Roy Buchanan
Buffalo Springfield
Solomon Burke
Gary Burton
Felix Cavaliere
Ray Charles
The Coasters
Ornette Coleman
John Coltrane
The Cookies
Gene Cornish
Cream
Danzig
Bobby Darin
Dino Danelli
The Drifters
Emerson, Lake and Palmer
Bryan Ferry
Roberta Flack
Aretha Franklin
Foreigner
Fotomaker
Genesis
Jon Hall
Hall and Oates
Donny Hathaway
 I Love My Wife (Original Cast Album)
 The Isley Brothers (with Jimi Hendrix)
The J. Geils Band
Keith Jarrett
Garland Jeffreys
Chaka Khan
Ben E. King
Hubert Laws
Led Zeppelin
Charles Lloyd
Melissa Manchester
Manhattan Transfer
Herbie Mann
Les McCann
Bette Midler
Charlie Mingus
Modern Jazz Quartet
Thelonious Monk
Willie Nelson
Charlie Parker
Robert Plant
Mike Posner
Andy Pratt
Ratt
The Rolling Stones
Diana Ross
Roxy Music
Rush
Sam and Dave
Shinedown
Carly Simon
Slave
Sister Sledge
Bruce Springsteen
Ringo Starr
Talking Heads
James Taylor
Kate Taylor
Television
Twisted Sister
The Velvet Underground
Narada Michael Walden
Winger
The Young Rascals

Mastering
Led Zeppelin II - Led Zeppelin (1969)
Hejira - Joni Mitchell (date unknown)
Diana - Diana Ross (1980)
Koo Koo - Debbie Harry (1981)
Soup For One - soundtrack of the film "Soup For One" (date unknown)
Inside Story - Grace Jones (by Barry Diament, date unknown)

References

Recording studios in Manhattan
1947 establishments in New York City
1990 disestablishments in New York (state)
Atlantic Records